Granot is a surname. Notable people with the surname include:

Archie Granot, paper cut artist based in Israel
Avraham Granot (1890–1962), Zionist activist, Israeli politician and a signatory of the Israeli declaration of independence
Elazar Granot (1927–2013), Israeli politician and writer

See also
Granot Central Cooperative, purchasing organization of the kibbutz movement in Israel
Neve Granot, neighborhood in Jerusalem, Israel, located behind the Israel Museum, overlooking the Monastery of the Cross